Acidomonas methanolica is an acidophilic, facultatively methylotrophic bacterium from the genus Acidomonas, which was isolated from septic methanol yeast in East Germany. Acidomonas methanolica is the only known species from the genus Acidomonas.

References

External links 
Type strain of Acidomonas methanolica at BacDive -  the Bacterial Diversity Metadatabase

Rhodospirillales
Bacteria described in 1989